The meridian 8° east of Greenwich is a line of longitude that extends from the North Pole across the Arctic Ocean, Europe, Africa, the Atlantic Ocean, the Southern Ocean, and Antarctica to the South Pole.

The 8th meridian east forms a great circle with the 172nd meridian west.

From Pole to Pole
Starting at the North Pole and heading south to the South Pole, the 8th meridian east passes through:

{| class="wikitable plainrowheaders"
! scope="col" width="125" | Co-ordinates
! scope="col" | Country, territory or sea
! scope="col" | Notes
|-
| style="background:#b0e0e6;" | 
! scope="row" style="background:#b0e0e6;" | Arctic Ocean
| style="background:#b0e0e6;" |
|-
| style="background:#b0e0e6;" | 
! scope="row" style="background:#b0e0e6;" | Atlantic Ocean
| style="background:#b0e0e6;" |
|-valign="top"
| 
! scope="row" | 
| Islands of Smøla and Tustna, the mainland (passing through Kristiansand), and the island of Flekkerøy.
|-valign="top"
| style="background:#b0e0e6;" | 
! scope="row" style="background:#b0e0e6;" | North Sea
| style="background:#b0e0e6;" | Passing just west of Jutland,  Passing just east of the island of Heligoland, 
|-
| 
! scope="row" | 
|
|-
| 
! scope="row" | 
|
|-
| 
! scope="row" | 
|
|-
| 
! scope="row" | 
|
|-
| 
! scope="row" | 
|
|-valign="top"
| style="background:#b0e0e6;" | 
! scope="row" style="background:#b0e0e6;" | Mediterranean Sea
| style="background:#b0e0e6;" | Passing just west of the islands of Sardinia and San Pietro, 
|-
| 
! scope="row" | 
|
|-
| 
! scope="row" | 
|
|-
| 
! scope="row" | 
|
|-
| 
! scope="row" | 
|
|-
| 
! scope="row" | 
|
|-valign="top"
| style="background:#b0e0e6;" | 
! scope="row" style="background:#b0e0e6;" | Atlantic Ocean
| style="background:#b0e0e6;" | Passing just west of the island of Bioko, 
|-
| style="background:#b0e0e6;" | 
! scope="row" style="background:#b0e0e6;" | Southern Ocean
| style="background:#b0e0e6;" |
|-
| 
! scope="row" | Antarctica
| Queen Maud Land, claimed by 
|-
|}

See also
7th meridian east
9th meridian east

e008th meridian east